Nakia Yarbrough Codie (born January 20, 1977) is a former American football defensive back who played one season with the Detroit Lions and 3 with the Pittsburgh Steelers of the National Football League. He played college football at Baylor University and attended Cleburne High School in Cleburne, Texas.

References

External links
Just Sports Stats

Living people
1977 births
Players of American football from North Carolina
American football defensive backs
African-American players of American football
Baylor Bears football players
Pittsburgh Steelers players
People from Onslow County, North Carolina
21st-century African-American sportspeople
20th-century African-American sportspeople